The Extensions to the International Phonetic Alphabet for Disordered Speech, commonly abbreviated extIPA , are a set of letters and diacritics devised by the International Clinical Phonetics and Linguistics Association to augment the International Phonetic Alphabet for the phonetic transcription of disordered speech. Some of the symbols are used for transcribing features of normal speech in IPA transcription, and are accepted as such by the International Phonetic Association.

Many sounds found only in disordered speech are indicated with diacritics, though an increasing number of dedicated letters are used as well. Special letters are included to transcribe the speech of people with lisps and cleft palates. The extIPA repeats several standard-IPA diacritics that are unfamiliar to most people but transcribe features that are common in disordered speech.

Sounds restricted to disordered speech include velopharyngeals, nasal fricatives (a.k.a. nareal fricatives) and some of the percussive consonants. Sounds sometimes found in the world's languages that do not have symbols in the basic IPA include denasals, the sublaminal percussive, post-alveolar lateral fricatives, and fricatives that are simultaneously lateral and sibilant.

ExtIPA was revised and expanded in 2015; the new symbols were added to Unicode in 2021.

Letters 
The non-IPA letters found in the extIPA are listed in the following table.

Several letters and superscript forms were added to Unicode 14 and 15. They had been added to the free Gentium Plus and Andika fonts by version 6.2 in February 2023.

Diacritics
Some of these extIPA diacritics are occasionally used for non-disordered speech, for example for the unusual airstream mechanisms of Damin.

One modification of regular IPA is the use of parentheses around the phonation diacritics to indicate partial phonation; a single parenthesis at the left or right of the voicing indicates that it is partially phonated at the beginning or end of the segment. These conventions may be convenient for representing various voice onset times. Phonation diacritics may also be prefixed or suffixed to represent relative timing beyond the segment (pre- and post-voicing etc.). The following are examples; in principle, any IPA or extIPA diacritic may be displaced in this manner.

The transcriptions for partial voicing and devoicing may be used in either the sense of degrees of voicing or in the sense that the voicing is discontinuous. For the former, both parentheses indicate the sound is mildly (partially) voiced throughout, and single parentheses mean a partial degree of voicing at the beginning or end of the sound. 
For the latter, both parentheses mean the sound is (de)voiced in the middle, while the single parentheses mean complete (de)voicing at the beginning or end of the sound. The implication is that such voicing or devoicing is atypical of the language being spoken. For example,  would be used for the usual devoicing or partial devoicing of the language, while  would indicate that the transcriber found the devoicing to be atypical, as in pathological speech. Similarly,  would indicate atypical devoicing at the beginning of the segment.

Altering the position of a diacritic relative to the letter indicates that the phonation begins before the consonant or vowel does or continues beyond it. The voiceless ring and other phonation diacritics can be used in the same way if needed.

Other extIPA diacritics are:

Diacritics may be placed within parentheses as the voicing diacritics are above. For example,  indicates a partially denasalized .

Following a longstanding tradition of the IPA not specified on the regular IPA chart, any IPA or extIPA letter may be used in superscript form as a diacritic, to indicate the onset, release or 'flavor' of another letter. In extIPA, this is provided specifically for the fricative release of a plosive.

The VoQS (voice-quality symbols) take IPA and extended-IPA diacritics, as well as several additional diacritics that are potentially available for extIPA transcription. The subscript dot for 'whisper' is sometimes found in IPA transcription, though that diacritic is also commonly used for apical-retroflex articulation.

Prosodic notation and indeterminate sounds
The Extended IPA has adopted bracket notation from conventions transcribing discourse. Parentheses are used to indicate mouthing (silent articulation), as in the common silent sign to hush . Parentheses are also used to indicate silent pauses, for example (...); the length of the pause may be indicated, as in (2.3 sec).

Double parentheses indicate that transcription is uncertain because of extraneous noise or speech, as when one person talks over another. As much detail as possible may be included, as in ⸨2 syll.⸩ or ⸨2σ⸩ for two obscured syllables. This is also IPA usage. Sometimes the obscuring noise will be indicated instead, as in ⸨cough⸩ or ⸨knock⸩, as in the illustrative transcription below; this notation may be used for extraneous noise that does not obscure speech, but which the transcriber nonetheless wishes to notate (e.g. because someone says 'excuse me' after coughing, or verbally responds to the knock on the door, and the noise is thus required to understand the speech).

In the extIPA, indistinguishable/unidentifiable sounds are circled rather than placed in single parentheses as in IPA. An empty circle, ◯, is used for an indeterminate segment, ◯σ  an indeterminate syllable, Ⓒ a segment identifiable only as a consonant, etc. Full capital letters, such as C in Ⓒ, are used as wild-cards for certain categories of sounds, and may combine with IPA and extIPA diacritics. For example, ◯   (a circled capital  with a voiceless diacritic) indicates an undetermined or indeterminate voiceless plosive. Regular IPA and extIPA letters may also be circled to indicate that their identification is uncertain. For example, ⓚ indicates that the segment is judged to probably be . At least in handwriting, the circle may be elongated into an oval for longer strings of symbols.

These are subscripted within a {curly brace} notation to indicate that they are comments on the intervening text. The VoQS conventions use similar notation for voice quality. These may be combined, for example with VoQS  for 'falsetto': 
{allegro I {F {p didn't p} know that F} allegro}
or

Chart
Three rows appear in the extIPA chart that do not occur in the IPA chart: "fricative lateral + median" (simultaneous grooved and lateral frication), "fricative nasal" (a.k.a. nareal fricative) and "percussive". A denasal row is added here. Several new columns appear as well, though the linguolabial column is the result of a standard-IPA diacritic. Dorso-velar and velo-dorsal are combined here, as are upper and lower alveolar.

Superscript variants

The customary use of superscript IPA letters is formalized in the extIPA, specifically for fricative releases of plosives, as can be seen in the lower-left of the full chart.

Speech pathologists also often use superscripting to indicate that a target sound has not been reached – for example,  for an instance of the word 'chicken' where the /k/ is incompletely articulated. However, due to the ambiguous meaning of superscripting in the IPA, this is not a convention supported by the ICPLA. An unambiguous transcription would mark the consonant more specifically as weakened or silent.

Sample text
A sample transcription of a written text read aloud, using extIPA and Voice Quality Symbols:

Original text: "The World Cup Finals of 1982 are held in Spain this year. They will involve the top nations of the World in a tournament lasting over four weeks, held at fourteen different centers in Spain. All of the first round games will be in the provincial towns with the semi-finals, and finals held in Barcelona and Madrid."

Notes

See also
Voice Quality Symbols
Sinological extensions to the International Phonetic Alphabet
Phonetic symbols in Unicode

References

Bibliography

External links
 Chart of extended IPA symbols for disordered speech (PDF, revised to 2015)
 Pronunciation videos of consonants in the main extIPA chart as of 2008

International Phonetic Alphabet
Communication disorders
1989 introductions